Juggernaut (Cain Marko) is a fictional character appearing in American comic books published by Marvel Comics. Created by writer Stan Lee and artist/co-writer Jack Kirby, he first appeared in X-Men #12 (July 1965) as an adversary of the eponymous superhero team. Since then, he has come into conflict with other heroes, primarily Spider-Man and the Hulk.

Cain Marko is a regular human who was empowered by a gem belonging to the deity Cyttorak, becoming a literal human juggernaut. He possesses superhuman strength and durability, and is virtually immune to most physical attacks; his helmet also protects him from mental attacks. Although not a mutant, Juggernaut has been featured as a prominent member of the Brotherhood of Mutants. He is also the stepbrother of Professor X.

Since his debut during the Silver Age of Comic Books, the character has appeared in over five decades of Marvel publications, featuring prominently in the X-Men titles and starring in two one-shot solo publications. The character has also been associated with Marvel merchandise including clothing, toys, trading cards, animated television series, video games. Vinnie Jones played Juggernaut in the 2006 film X-Men: The Last Stand, while Ryan Reynolds provided motion capture and voice acting for the CGI character in the 2018 film Deadpool 2. In some reinterpretations (most notably the X-Men film series), Marko is a mutant who was born with his powers, while in others they simply come from his costume.

In 2008, Juggernaut was ranked 188th on Wizards list of Top 200 Comic Book Characters. In 2009, Juggernaut was ranked 19th on IGN's list of Top 100 Comic Book Villains. IGN also ranked him as Spider-Man's 22nd greatest enemy.

Publication history

The character debuted as an antagonist of the eponymous mutant superhero team in X-Men #12–13 (July & September 1965). In the first of these issues, he rampaged unseen throughout the X-Men's headquarters while the team's leader, Professor X, related the character's origin in a series of flashbacks.

After an initial defeat in the following issue, the Juggernaut returned in X-Men #32–33 (May–June 1967), and returned again in X-Men #46 (July 1968), then fought the sorcerer Doctor Strange in Doctor Strange #182 (September 1969), X-Men member the Beast in Amazing Adventures #16 (January 1973), and the Hulk in The Incredible Hulk vol. 2 #172 (February 1974).

After the canceled X-Men returned in the mid-1970s, the Juggernaut returned to fight a new iteration of the team in X-Men #101–103 (October 1975–February 1976). Storylines in Spider-Woman #37–38 (April & June 1981) and The Amazing Spider-Man #229–230 (June–July 1982) explored the Juggernaut's relationship with his ally Black Tom Cassidy.

The X-Men and Spider-Man proved to be regular foes for the character, who appeared in The Uncanny X-Men #183 (July 1984), Marvel Team-up #150 (February 1985), and The Uncanny X-Men #194 (June 1985). The Juggernaut guest-starred in Secret Wars II #7 (January 1986), battled a new generation of mutants in X-Men #217–218 (April & June 1987), appeared in a flashback story in Marvel Saga #21 (August 1987), and in a humorous episode in Excalibur #3 (December 1988).

The Juggernaut also participated in the "Acts of Vengeance" storyline in Thor #411–412 (December 1989) and returned in Thor #429 (February 1991). Other appearances included an encounter with his creator, Cyttorak, in X-Men Unlimited #12 (September 1996) and starring in the one-shot issue Juggernaut #1 (April 1997).

In 1994 Marvel purchased Malibu Comics and began a series of crossovers that saw Marvel characters entering the Malibu Ultraverse. In 1995–1996, Juggernaut lead a group of Ultras, who were named The All New Exiles. The All New Exiles met up with the X-Men in a special Malibu/Marvel collaboration, The All New Exiles vs X-Men #0, dated October 1995.

The character appeared in Juggernaut: The Eighth Day #1 (November 1999) and Avengers vol. 3 #23–25 (December 1999–February 2000) with similarly powered avatars and attempted a reformation in The Uncanny X-Men # 410–413 (September–December 2002) and X-Men #162–164 (November 2004–January 2005). The Juggernaut confronted his stepbrother, Charles Xavier—leader of the X-Men—in X-Men: Legacy #219 (February 2009), and fought the Hulk in Hulk #602 (November 2009).

He appeared as a regular character in Thunderbolts beginning with issue #144, and remained on the team until issue #158, during the Fear Itself limited series.

Juggernaut had a solo comic in 2020, by Fabian Nicieza and Ron Garney. Despite being a character from the X-Men franchise, it has plots of its own that do not crossover with the ongoing Dawn of X.

Fictional character biography
1960s
Cain Marko is the son of Kurt Marko, who becomes Charles Xavier's stepfather when he marries Sharon Xavier after the death of her husband Brian, for which Kurt is partially responsible. Kurt Marko favors Charles and abuses his own son, Cain. Cain resents Charles and bullies him frequently. Cain Marko and his step-brother Charles serve in the US Army and are stationed in Korea. Marko finds a hidden temple dedicated to the entity Cyttorak. On entering, Marko finds and holds a huge ruby and reads the inscription on the stone aloud: "Whosoever touches this gem shall be granted the power of the Crimson Gem of Cyttorak! Henceforth, you who read these words, shall become ... forevermore ... a human juggernaut!" The gem channels Cyttorak's power into Marko. The transformation causes a cave-in, and the character is buried and presumably killed, not being heard from again until a sudden assault on the X-Men's headquarters.

Xavier recounts the Juggernaut's origin to the X-Men, and after shrugging off the mansion's defenses and brushing aside the X-Men, Marko is seen clearly in the final panel as he confronts Xavier. The X-Men regroup and attack, while Xavier summons Fantastic Four member the Human Torch to aid the mutants; the Torch generates 'pulses' of flame that essentially hypnotize the Juggernaut, distracting him long enough for Angel to remove his helmet, making Marko susceptible to a telepathic attack by Xavier.

The Juggernaut returns seeking revenge and is delayed by three of the X-Men while Cyclops and Marvel Girl, aided by the astral form of mystic Doctor Strange, find and use another jewel of Cyttorak, which banishes the Juggernaut to the "Crimson Cosmos", the home dimension of Cyttorak. When the Juggernaut reappears, the character has gained mystical abilities and briefly battles the mystic Doctor Strange before being banished to an alternate universe by the cosmic entity Eternity.

1970s
Juggernaut reappears on Earth through sheer force of will, although the alien dimension caused him to age rapidly. The panicking villain battles former X-Man the Beast before being drawn back to the same dimension. An entity from his prison dimension reverses the aging process and removes the mystical powers on the proviso that the villain never return. The Juggernaut is accidentally pulled back to Earth at the Hulkbuster base by an interdimensional device designed to banish the Hulk. The Hulk aids the Juggernaut in escaping from the base but attacks him when the Juggernaut threatens a civilian. During the battle, the Juggernaut's helmet is removed, and he is surprised and defeated by Professor X, Cyclops, and Marvel Girl.

The Juggernaut befriends Black Tom Cassidy, the cousin of X-Man Banshee, and battles the first generation of new X-Men. When Tom falls off the battlements of Cassidy Keep after a sword duel with Banshee, Juggernaut jumps after him into the sea.

1980s
Black Tom uses his niece Siryn, who possesses the same powers as her father Banshee, to steal a shipment of the metal vibranium. The Juggernaut battles Spider-Woman and the X-Men and is the only one of the criminal trio to escape capture. After freeing him from prison, Black Tom decides that the psychic Madame Web could be useful in his criminal pursuits. On arriving in New York City, Tom sends the Juggernaut to capture Madame Web; Juggernaut destroys several city blocks in the process, and ignores Spider-Man's best efforts to stop him. He almost kills Web by accident when he removes her from a life support device, and abandons her. A frustrated Spider-Man lures the Juggernaut into setting concrete, poured for the foundation of an office high-rise, into which he sinks without a trace; he takes over a month to dig his way out.

The Juggernaut, in civilian guise, has a bar fight with the X-Man Colossus, who is at first unaware of the villain's true identity. After another battle against Spider-Man and the X-Men, the Juggernaut encounters the futuristic Sentinel Nimrod, who humiliates and defeats him. The Juggernaut is one of the villains assembled by Mephisto to battle the cosmic entity the Beyonder. The Juggernaut battles an all-new generation of X-Men, appears in a flashback story with the original X-Men, and has a humorous encounter with Captain Britain.

The Juggernaut also participates in the "Acts of Vengeance," battling the Thunder God Thor and teen superteam the New Warriors.

1990s
The Juggernaut continues to feature prominently in Marvel titles battling Thor once again and starring opposite other characters such as the mutant team X-Force, Doctor Strange, the Hulk (allied at the time with master villain the Red Skull and tricking and capturing the Hulk with the same "civilian" guise used against Colossus), mercenary Deadpool, the villain turned antihero Venom, and multiple battles with the X-Men. Briefly, he traveled to the Ultraverse and joined the superhero team Exiles. After his return to the Marvel Universe, the Juggernaut suffers a major setback during the Onslaught storyline, being defeated and then humiliated by the entity when imprisoned in the Gem of Cyttorak. The Juggernaut, however, escapes.

The Juggernaut also stars in a solo story and the "Eighth Day" storyline, which introduces the entities the Exemplars. The Juggernaut and seven other humans are revealed to have all been empowered and corrupted by mystical entities, and as avatars enforce their will on Earth. The Juggernaut resists the influence of Cyttorak and when captured by other Exemplars is aided by the superhero team the Avengers. Leader Captain America convinces the other Exemplars that they have been manipulated by the mystical entities, who then decide to leave Earth.

2000s
The Juggernaut, courtesy of a ruse engineered by Black Tom Cassidy, allies with and joins the X-Men; the plan is to destroy the team from within. When Cassidy openly betrays the Juggernaut, Marko attempts to change his ways and joins the X-Men.The Uncanny X-Men #410 - 411 (Oct. 2002); #412 (Nov. 2002). Marvel Comics. The Juggernaut befriends a young mutant boy called Sammy Paré, who helps Marko reform, despite setbacks such as a battle with the Canadian superhero team Alpha Flight. However, when Paré discovers that Exodus' Brotherhood of Mutants is preparing to attack the X-Men's headquarters while unaware that Juggernaut is the mole in their group, he is killed by Black Tom Cassidy. An enraged Juggernaut attacks Cassidy and his allies, and the battle strands all participants in the Mojoverse.

The Juggernaut reappears and joins the team New Excalibur for a brief period. One storyline expands on the Juggernaut's origin and reveals that Marko is only the most recent of a series of incarnations of Cyttorak's avatar; each battles a challenger to the death for the right to retain the entity's power.

During the World War Hulk storyline, the Juggernaut's power begins to wane, but by shunning his stepbrother Xavier and returning to his villainous nature, he is able to restore the link with Cyttorak, becoming powerful enough to hold his own against the Hulk. Despite an attempt by Xavier to reform Marko, he concedes that redemption is impossible.

2010s

While training his son Skaar, Bruce Banner bombs Juggernaut's house to initiate a confrontation between Skaar and the Juggernaut. Skaar manages to win his first fight by throwing the Juggernaut into open space, proving to his father that he has the ability to use cunning and strategy in combat, and not simply physical strength.

During The Gauntlet storyline, Spider-Man finds the Juggernaut unconscious. The government comes along and transports the Juggernaut to a secure facility. Spider-Man sneaks into the facility to ask the Juggernaut who did this to him. Then, a new Captain Universe breaks into the room and claims he's there to slay the Juggernaut. Spider-Man learns that Captain Universe is a man named William Nguyen who wants revenge on Juggernaut for ruining his life during his previous fight with Spider-Man over Madame Web. When he insists on trying to kill Juggernaut instead of fixing the tectonic plates beneath New York City, the Uni-Power leaves Nguyen and enters the Juggernaut. The Juggernaut, as Captain Universe, repairs the damage to the tectonic plates that was caused by him during the same rampage that ruined Nguyen's life.

Following the Siege storyline, Juggernaut is shown at The Raft at the start of the Heroic Age storyline – weakened, since Cyttorak apparently took his temporary empowerment by the Uni-Power as an affront and withheld part of his "blessing". Following Luke Cage's appointment as leader of the Thunderbolts, Cain is brought up for suggestion for the program. While Cage is initially against his joining, Professor X telepathically contacts Luke and asks him to reconsider, believing he has a chance at redemption despite what he previously told Cain. Juggernaut agrees to do whatever Luke says, partly because he is now suffused with nanomachines which can affect him in his weakened state.

During the Fear Itself storyline, one of the seven Hammers of the Worthy that was launched to Earth by Serpent: God of Fear lands near Juggernaut. Juggernaut lifts it and becomes Kuurth: Breaker of Stone. His transformation is enough to level the Raft, causing a mass prison break. Kuurth makes his way to California and fights the X-Men. Magik, Colossus, and Shadowcat go to Cyttorak's dimension and inform it that the Serpent has control over Juggernaut. Magik strikes a deal with Cyttorak, who chooses her to become the new host of the Juggernaut's powers. However, the entity transfers the Juggernaut's powers to Colossus instead. Colossus is able to turn the tide on Kuurth before Kuurth is teleported away by the Serpent. During the last battle between the Avengers and the Worthy, Kuurth is defeated by Wolverine using his Uru armor and loses his hammer when the Serpent is killed by Thor.

Cain Marko, apparently having been incarcerated after the events of Fear Itself, having lost the power of both Kuurth and Cyttorak (but retaining his enormous physique) is released into military custody. Subsequently, he is taken to the borders of the country of Sharzhad just as the Thunderbolts return from their tumultuous tumble through time, and Satana aids Man-Thing in opening a gateway to the Crimson Cosmos (or possibly an alternate universe where Cain Marko had died while still the Juggernaut). Pushing his hand through, Marko is re-empowered, becoming the Juggernaut once more, just in time to thunder forth and smash through the otherwise unbreakable force field surrounding the country. This allows the Thunderbolts to resolve an otherwise deadly threat to the planet, as had been orchestrated by the Ghost, who had sent the request for Marko's release back through time. He soon loses these borrowed powers again and lives in solitude in the desert, still, it seems, super-strong, although not mystically-empowered. Meanwhile, Magik purges the Juggernaut powers from Colossus with her Soulsword.

After a time, Cyttorak causes the Crimson Gem to reappear in the ancient temple and emit a call for suitable candidates to become a new Juggernaut. Cain Marko, finally having found peace—even tending a vegetable garden—senses the call and, having armed himself, coerces the Vanisher to take him to the Gem's location. He comes into conflict with a team of X-Men (having been alerted by Colossus, who also perceived the call), as well as seekers of the Juggernaut's power such as Man-Killer. Marko and Colossus struggle with one another, only to realize that they have the same goal—to destroy the Crimson Gem and prevent another avatar being empowered. Ahmet Adbol, the former Living Monolith, claims the Gem and is transformed into an amalgam of Living Monolith and Juggernaut. As the colossal new Juggernaut wreaks havoc in the countryside, Colossus invokes Cyttorak, and the god responds to his former exemplar. Arguing that the Monolith-Juggernaut will eventually fail Cyttorak, as all his former avatars have done, Colossus challenges him to try something new: empower him enough to kill Cyttorak himself. Apparently daunted by this prospect, the god withdraws his power from Ahmet Abdol and instead empowers another avatar, to a greater extent than any Juggernaut has ever been. However, the new avatar is not Colossus, but once more Cain Marko. Marko is full of rage, which he focuses on the X-Men and specifically Cyclops (who isn't even present), for killing Professor Xavier. Now more powerful than ever and stripped of even his last weaknesses, he feels that Charles Xavier was the only one who ever truly believed in Cain Marko. Colossus attempts to battle the empowered Juggernaut, but dodges Cain's blows rather than fighting him head on. Peter "cheats" and strikes the sea side cliff edge where they had been fighting, causing Cain to fall into the ocean below. However, he is seen rising from the waves once again.

The Juggernaut and Black Tom resurface attacking a luxury yacht, but they are confronted by the time-displaced young X-Men, with Jean knocking Black Tom out while Beast - who has been training in magic - creates a dimensional portal that passes through Hell before sending Juggernaut to Siberia.

Cain next appears in Iceman #5, still looking for those responsible who killed his step-brother Charles Xavier. He runs into Iceman, who is having family issues of his own. Bobby, thankful for the distraction, engages Cain. At the end of the fight, Iceman encases Juggernaut in an ice cage and rockets him into the nearby river via ice elevator sling-shot. Then he creates some ice simulacrum that carry/swim him down river, removing Cain from the area altogether.

A continuation where Iceman #5 left off, Cain is apprehended by S.H.I.E.L.D. and is being flown to a secure location but gets accidentally summoned by Dr. Voodoo to the X-Mansion. Cain fights a mixed team of veterans (Rogue, Quicksilver, Wanda, Dr. Voodoo & Wasp) and newbie (Quicksilver's latest girl-friend: Synapse). Once Juggernaut has engaged them, Rogue power punches him away from the team to give them more space. Quicksilver attempts to finish the fight quickly by racing Synapse over to Cain to get his helmet off so she can mentally neutralize him. Pietro quickly gets the helmet off but finds out Cain's wearing a mental protection skull cap underneath. Cain subsequently attacks Synapse, almost killing her. More battle ensues and Dr. Voodoo sends his summoned Cyttorak minions to "fix" Cain's armor and thus "sealing" him inside his armor. The little Cyttorak builders then carry Cain back into Cyttorak's realm and Doctor Voodoo closes the portal.

During the "Sins Rising" arc, Juggernaut is shown to be an inmate at Ravencroft. Using Mister Negative's powers to corrupt the clone of Ashley Kafka, a revived Sin-Eater steals Juggernaut's powers.

During the "Sinister War" storyline, Kindred revived Sin-Eater again and one of the demonic centipedes that emerged from his body took possession of Juggernaut making him one of the members of the Sinful Six.

Powers and abilities
Wolverine describes Juggernaut as "the closest thing on Earth to an irresistible force". When Cain Marko finds the stone of mystical entity Cyttorak, he is empowered with magical energies and transformed into an immortal avatar for the entity in question. As the Juggernaut, Marko possesses superhuman strength, being capable of shattering mountains, lifting and using buildings as weapons, and extreme durability.

Juggernaut is able to generate a mystical force field that grants him additional invulnerability to any physical attack when it is at its maximum, including Colossus's punches. Even when the force field is temporarily absorbed by Thor's hammer, the Juggernaut's natural durability still proves to be great enough to withstand blows from Thor. The Juggernaut is described as physically unstoppable once in motion, does not tire from physical activity, and is able to survive without food, water, or oxygen. The Juggernaut heals quickly, as when he was stabbed through the eyes by Shatterstar, the wounds were healed almost immediately.

It is possible for an opponent with sufficient physical or mystical strength of their own to turn the Juggernaut's unstoppable movement against him, by redirecting his motion so that he gets stranded in a position in which he has no escape; both the Hulk and his son, Skaar, have done this physically, and Thor has done it mystically with Mjolnir.Thor #412. Marvel Comics. The only character to have stopped Juggernaut while he was in motion as an act of pure physical strength was the Hulk while he was War, a horseman of Apocalypse and empowered with Celestial technology.

When Marko gains complete access to the Gem's powers during the Trion saga, it increases his power a thousandfold. Trion Juggernaut is capable of altering the size of matter, growing in size, tracking, levitation, absorbing and projecting energy, increasing his own strength, and creating portals through space-time. Conversely, when Marko once shared the Gem's power with his best friend, Black Tom, the power it bestowed upon them both was halved, making them more vulnerable to attacks from Spider-Man and the X-Men.

The character is vulnerable to mental attacks, a weakness that has been exploited via the removal of his helmet, which normally protects him from such. The Juggernaut has circumvented this weakness on occasion by wearing a metal skullcap inside his main helmet. If Juggernaut loses his helmet, he can magically recreate it from available raw materials (as long as he possesses the full power of the gem).

After Cyttorak's re-empowering of Cain Marko, his strength and durability were raised to higher levels than ever before, and his vulnerability to mental attacks was negated.

Reception
 In 2014, Entertainment Weekly ranked Juggernaut 81st in their "Let's rank every X-Man ever" list.
 In 2018, CBR.com ranked Cain Marko 4th in their "Age Of Apocalypse: The 30 Strongest Characters In Marvel's Coolest Alternate World" list.

Other versions
Age of Apocalypse
In the Age of Apocalypse universe, Cain is a monk who works as a protector of Avalon. He guides Mystique and Nightcrawler to meet Destiny, but subsequently suffers an aneurysm when his desire not to hurt others conflicts with his lust for violence during an attack on Avalon.

Days of Future Past
Juggernaut is mentioned in thought by Rachel Summers as having been alive in her original timeline, where he shared the power of the Cyttorak Jewel with Black Tom and they assisted the mutant resistance in their fight against the Sentinels for a time.

Marvel Zombies
In the Marvel Zombies universe, a zombified Juggernaut is seen in a horde of zombified villains. He is later killed by Wolverine when Wolverine shoves his fist in Juggernaut's mouth and proceeds to use his newly obtained cosmic powers to decapitate him.

MC2
In the futuristic MC2 universe, the title J2 stars the son of the Juggernaut, Zane Yama. Yama, who inherits his father's powers and goes by the name J2, joins the future Avengers and is reunited with his father Cain Marko, who is trapped in an alternate dimension.

What If?
There are two different stories of "What If" that revolve around Juggernaut:

In a reality where Xavier acquires the Crimson Gem rather than Cain, Cain joins forces with Magneto and Xavier's disillusioned students, the X-Men. Believing that Xavier's more ruthless methods contradict his alleged dream of peaceful co-existence and using a telepathy-blocking headband to prevent Xavier from realizing what he is up to, they expel the Juggernaut into space. Cain leaves with Magneto after Xavier's Juggernaut is dispatched.
In What if? vol. 2 #94, in a reality where Cain successfully defeats the X-Men in their first battle, the Sentinels are thus released in mass numbers without the X-Men to oppose them, resulting in Earth's destruction in their subsequent assault. Although Cain eventually destroys the Sentinels through sheer persistence, he is left alone wandering in a post-apocalyptic wasteland with all other humans, and even animals, having been killed by the radiation released by the Sentinels. In his eagerness for human company, he also unintentionally destroys a hidden enclave of humans and mutants conserved by Magneto.

Ultimate Marvel

The Ultimate Marvel imprint title Ultimate X-Men features an alternate universe version of the Juggernaut, who is originally part of the Weapon X program and has ties to Rogue, having grown up in the same trailer park. At some point in his life he was incarcerated by Weapon X and forced to act as a living weapon under the direction of Col. John Wraith. Juggernaut is part of the strike force that takes out the X-Men, forcing them into Weapon X as well. Cain and Rogue share a cell while both are forced to serve Weapon X. When The Brotherhood of Mutant Supremacy remove the security implants that are prohibiting the mutants from leaving their cells, Juggernaut fights for his freedom. After the entire ordeal, Cain is offered a place with both Xavier's X-Men and The Brotherhood. Cain chooses The Brotherhood but later leaves the team for parts unknown. Cain is captured by S.H.I.E.L.D. However, en route to a prison designed to contain the Hulk, there is an accident, and Cain broke free. Retrieving his helmet, he tracks down Rogue, who is a thief along with Gambit, stealing the Cyttorak Gem from the Fenris twins. He also reveals that he has a crush on Rogue. Juggernaut is bonded with the gem when Gambit shoves it into his helmet.

During the Ultimatum storyline, Juggernaut helps Rogue in defending the X-Mansion from anti-mutant soldiers led by William Stryker. He is shot in the eye by a poisonous dart fired by one of the anti-mutant soldiers and dies in Rogue's arms.

Marvel Apes
In the Marvel Apes universe, there is a primate version of Juggernaut called Juggermonk''' who is a member of the Ape-Vengers.

Worst X-Man Ever
Juggernaut attempted to steal a fortune only to battle the New Mutants. Juggernaut was ultimately stopped when Minerva created a well under Juggernaut sending him to the bottom of the Earth.

In other media
Television
 The Juggernaut appears in the Spider-Man and His Amazing Friends episode "A Firestar is Born", voiced by William H. Marshall and with stock grunts provided by Bob Holt.
 The Juggernaut appears in Pryde of the X-Men, voiced by Ron Gans. This version is a member of the Brotherhood of Mutant Terrorists.
 The Juggernaut appears in X-Men: The Animated Series, voiced by Rick Bennett.
 The Juggernaut makes a non-speaking cameo appearance in the Fantastic Four episode "Nightmare in Green".
 The Juggernaut appears in X-Men: Evolution, voiced by Paul Dobson. This version is Professor X's half-brother whose powers are the result of a dormant mutant ability awakened by the Gem of Cyttorak. Throughout his appearances, Mystique frees him from prison to facilitate her goals multiple times, though the X-Men successfully defeat him each time.
 The Juggernaut appears in Wolverine and the X-Men, voiced by Fred Tatasciore. This version is an inhabitant of Genosha and a member of Magneto's Acolytes.
 The Juggernaut appears in The Super Hero Squad Show episode "Enter Dormammu", voiced by Tom Kenny. This version is a member of Doctor Doom's Lethal Legion.
 The Juggernaut appears in Black Panther, voiced by Peter Lurie.
 The Juggernaut appears in Ultimate Spider-Man, voiced by Kevin Michael Richardson.
 The Juggernaut appears in Marvel Disk Wars: The Avengers, voiced by Shota Yamamoto.

Film

 In the first script for X-Men (2000), written by Andrew Kevin Walker, the Juggernaut was going to appear as a member of Magneto's Brotherhood of Mutants. However, this was scrapped when Walker rewrote the script.
 The Juggernaut appears in X-Men: The Last Stand, portrayed by Vinnie Jones. This version serves as a member of Magneto's Brotherhood and a mutant with the inability to be halted once he starts running and superhuman strength sufficient to fight Wolverine to a standstill. Additionally, he possesses no explicit connection to Charles Xavier or the Gem of Cyttorak. During the Brotherhood's final battle with the X-Men, Magneto orders the Juggernaut to destroy a mutant cure, but the latter is foiled by Kitty Pryde and knocks himself out when he attempts to run through a wall while in the presence of the power-negating Leech. Jones has said he would like to reprise the role in a spin-off, as he felt there was too little time in The Last Stand for him to imbue the character with depth.
 The Juggernaut was originally going to appear in X-Men: Days of Future Past, portrayed Josh Helman. However the character was replaced by Quicksilver while Helman was recast as William Stryker instead.
 The Juggernaut appears in Deadpool 2 as a computer-generated special effects character created through the use of motion capture performance. While he is credited "as himself", it was later revealed that the character was a composite of multiple actors. Ryan Reynolds provided the voice acting, with his pitch digitally altered, as well as the physical motion capture for the character in various scenes while David Leitch provided the facial motion capture performance and performed on-set motion capture performance in shots where Reynolds as Deadpool and the Juggernaut interact. The Juggernaut is initially imprisoned at the Icebox, an isolated prison for mutants used by the Department of Mutant Contentment, where he befriends Russell Collins. Collins frees the Juggernaut while they are being transferred to another prison, allowing the latter to destroy the convoy before they head off to destroy the orphanage where Collins was abused by its headmaster. While Deadpool, Cable, and Domino intercept them, the Juggernaut fends them off until Colossus, Negasonic Teenage Warhead, and Yukio arrive and defeat him.

Video games
 The Juggernaut appears as a boss in The Uncanny X-Men.
 The Juggernaut appears as a boss in Captain America and The Avengers.
 The Juggernaut appears as a boss in X-Men (1992).
 The Juggernaut appears as a boss in Spider-Man and the X-Men in Arcade's Revenge.
 The Juggernaut appears in X-Men (1993).
 The Juggernaut appears as a Danger Room simulation in X-Men: Mutant Apocalypse.
 The Juggernaut appears as a boss in X-Men: Children of the Atom.
 The Juggernaut appears as a boss and playable character in Marvel Super Heroes.
 The Juggernaut appears as a playable character in X-Men vs. Street Fighter.
 The Juggernaut appears as an assist character in Marvel vs. Capcom: Clash of Super Heroes.
 The Juggernaut appears as a playable character in Marvel vs. Capcom 2: New Age of Heroes.
 The Juggernaut appears as a boss in X-Men: Mutant Academy 2 as a member of the Brotherhood of Mutants.
 The Juggernaut appears as a playable character in X-Men: Next Dimension, voiced by Fred Tatasciore. This version is a member of the Brotherhood of Mutants.
 The Juggernaut appears as a boss in X2: Wolverine's Revenge, voiced again by Fred Tatasciore.
 The Juggernaut appears as a boss in X-Men Legends, voiced by John DiMaggio.
 The Juggernaut appears as a playable character in X-Men Legends II: Rise of Apocalypse, voiced again by John DiMaggio. This version is a member of the Brotherhood of Mutants.
 The Juggernaut appears as a boss in the Game Boy Advance version of X-Men: The Official Game.
 The Juggernaut appears as a playable character in the Xbox 360, PS3, PS4, Xbox One and PC versions of Marvel: Ultimate Alliance 2, voiced again by John DiMaggio. Additionally, his Ultimate Marvel counterpart appears as an unlockable alternate skin.
 The Juggernaut appears as a boss in Spider-Man: Shattered Dimensions, voiced by Matt Willig. In the final Amazing segment, he is pursued by Silver Sable and the Wild Pack for a bounty on his head and unknowingly picks up a fragment of the Tablet of Order and Chaos that Spider-Man was after. After losing his helmet while fighting Spider-Man, the Juggernaut discovers the fragment and uses its power to strengthen himself. Due to the fragment interfering with the Gem of Cyttorak however, Spider-Man is able to defeat him. The Juggernaut is later seen during the end credits, having been apprehended by the Wild Pack.
 The Juggernaut appears as a boss in Marvel Super Hero Squad Online, voiced by Travis Willingham.
 The Juggernaut appears in X-Men: Destiny, voiced once again by Fred Tatasciore. This version is a member of the Brotherhood of Mutants.
 The Juggernaut appears as a boss and unlockable character in Marvel: Avengers Alliance. This version is a member of the Brotherhood of Mutants.
 The Juggernaut appears as a boss and playable character in Marvel Heroes, voiced again by Fred Tatasciore.
 The Juggernaut appears in Lego Marvel Super Heroes, voiced by Andrew Kishino. This version a member of the Brotherhood of Mutants.
 The Juggernaut appears in Marvel Ultimate Alliance 3: The Black Order, voiced again by Peter Lurie. This version is a member of the Brotherhood of Mutants.

Books
 The Juggernaut appears as a holodeck simulation in Planet X.
 The Juggernaut appears in the novel X-Men: The Jewels of Cyttorak.
 The Juggernaut appears in the third novel of the X-Men: Mutant Empire trilogy, fighting alongside the X-Men to stop Magneto from conquering Manhattan.

Music
The song "Legendary Iron Hood" by Open Mike Eagle from the album Brick Body Kids Still Daydream is written from the perspective of the Juggernaut.

Internet parody
On February 14, 2006, the parody troupe My Way Entertainment released "The Juggernaut Bitch!!", an overdub of part of the X-Men animated TV series episode "Phoenix Saga (Part 3): The Cry of the Banshee". "The Juggernaut Bitch!!" uses a variety of slang, profanity and non sequiturs through ad-libbing. The parody includes the often-repeated line, "Don't you know who the fuck I am? I'm the Juggernaut, bitch!" At first, the clip was made available on the duo's college website, but when YouTube became popular, so did the parody.

The internet meme became so popular that the line was included in X-Men: The Last Stand during Juggernaut's fight with Kitty Pryde. In June 2006, My Way released a sequel, "J2: Juggment Day", using footage from the episode "Juggernaut Returns". On June 10, 2007, My Way released a second sequel, entitled "J3: Shadow of the Colossi", on their website, using footage from "The Unstoppable Juggernaut" and "Pryde of the X-Men". The video game Call of Duty: Modern Warfare 2'' has an achievement called "I'm the Juggernaut..." which references the parody.

Collected editions

See also
 "Nothing Can Stop the Juggernaut!"

References

External links
 Juggernaut (Cain Marko) at Marvel.com

Characters created by Jack Kirby
Characters created by Stan Lee
Comics characters introduced in 1965
Deadpool characters
Excalibur (comics)
Fictional avatars
Fictional characters with immortality
Fictional characters with superhuman durability or invulnerability
Fictional Korean War veterans
Male characters in film
Marvel Comics characters who can move at superhuman speeds
Marvel Comics characters who use magic
Marvel Comics characters with accelerated healing
Marvel Comics characters with superhuman strength
Marvel Comics film characters
Marvel Comics male superheroes
Marvel Comics male supervillains
Ultraverse
Villains in animated television series
X-Men supporting characters